Pilot licensing in the United Kingdom is regulated by the Civil Aviation Authority (CAA).

History

When the UK was part of EASA, pilots were licensed in accordance with EASA Part-FCL (Flight Crew Licensing). The UK also issued the National PPL (NPPL).

When the UK left EASA after Brexit, Part-FCL was adopted into UK law as UK Part-FCL. The UK continues to issue non-Part-FCL licences as well.

Categories of aircraft

The categories of aircraft recognised in the UK are:

Aeroplanes
Helicopters
Airships
Sailplanes
Balloons
Gyroplanes

UK Part-FCL licences are issued for a particular category of aircraft:
 Aeroplanes (A) (that can including touring motor-gliders)
 Helicopters (H)
 Sailplanes (S) - Part-SFCL
 Balloons (B) - Part-BFCL
 
UK licences are issued for:
 Light aircraft – (NPPL A)
 Microlights – (NPPL M)
 Gyroplanes (G)
 Balloons (B)
 Airships (As)
 
The abbreviations are combined with the licence level held, for example a Commercial Pilot Licence for Balloons can be written as CPL(B).

Levels of licence
The UK currently grants several levels of licence:
 UK National Private Pilot Licence (NPPL)
 UK Private Pilot Licence (PPL)
 UK Airline Transport Pilot Licence (ATPL)
 UK Part-FCL Light Aircraft Pilot Licence (LAPL)
 UK Part-FCL Private Pilot Licence (PPL)
 UK Part-FCL Commercial Pilot Licence (CPL)
 UK Part-FCL Airline Transport Pilot Licence (ATPL)

The licence held by a pilot confers privileges on the sort of flying they may carry out—broadly, whether or not they may receive remuneration for doing so—and are independent of any aircraft type, or class, ratings included in the holder's licence and other ratings required for flying under specified conditions.

Currently British glider pilots do not require a CAA-granted licence. Regulation of gliding is through the British Gliding Association and its affiliated clubs. However, from April 2021 they will require a CAA issued LAPL(S) (or the international Sailplane Pilot Licence (SPL)) to fly UK Part-21 sailplanes. The UK NPPL has close links with the gliding community and a gliding certificate can be converted.

NPPL
The UK National Private Pilot Licence is a restricted form of the PPL introduced in 2002 for recreational pilots. It has a less stringent medical requirement than the UK Part-FCL PPL and a reduced flying syllabus.
 
The NPPL is administered by the National Pilots Licensing Group under supervision of the CAA. It is granted in two forms:
 NPPL (SSEA/SLMG) for Simple Single Engined Aircraft and Self-Launching Motor Gliders
 NPPL (Microlight and Powered Parachute)
 
The NPPL is a sub-ICAO licence meaning the holder is limited to operating only UK-registered aircraft and it cannot be used outside of the UK without permission from the regulatory authorities of any foreign jurisdictions whose airspace the holder intends to operate into. The holder, when operating under the privileges of the NPPL, is furthermore restricted to operations in accordance with VFR. The NPPL is more restrictive in respect of additional aircraft ratings which may be added compared with a UK Part-FCL PPL or LAPL.

The NPPL does not require an English language proficiency test.

LAPL

The Light Aircraft Pilot Licence (LAPL) is not an ICAO-recognised licence, however it is compatible with EASA.

PPL
The private pilot licence confers on the holder a privilege to act as the pilot in command of certain kinds of aircraft. The holder may not operate for valuable consideration, i.e. any form of reward, either financial or in kind. However, subject to national restrictions governing the soliciting of passengers to be carried on board an aircraft operated by a PPL holder, and in addition to several other requirements, a PPL holder may carry passengers who make a remunerative contribution toward the direct cost of the flights.
 
A flying instructor rating may be included, subject to requirements under UK Part-FCL being satisfied, in a UK Part-FCL PPL provided the applicant has successfully completed a number of additional examinations. Such a person giving instruction in flying training may be remunerated.
 
Applicants for a private pilot licence must be at least 17 years old, hold a valid UK Part-MED Class 2 medical certificate, and have met the specified practical and theoretical training requirements laid down in UK Part-FCL.

PPL courses require at least 45 hours of flight instruction. This must include at least 25 hours of dual flight instruction, at least 10 hours of supervised solo flight time, and at least 5 hours of solo cross-country flight time. Up to 5 hours of instruction may be undertaken in a simulator. Pilots must also undergo a solo flight of at least 150 nautical miles, including full stop landings at two aerodromes different from the departure aerodrome.

In addition to the practical training requirements, nine multiple choice theory examinations must be passed. The pass mark for every exam is 75%; the nine subjects are:

 Air law
 Aircraft general knowledge
 Flight performance and planning
 Human performance and planning
 Meteorology
 Navigation
 Operational procedures
 Principles of flight
 Communications

CPL
The commercial pilot licence allows the holder to act as the pilot in command of an aircraft for valuable consideration in single pilot operations. It also permits the holder to act as a co-pilot of a multi-crew aircraft for which they are qualified subject to their (i) holding a valid certificate of multi-crew co-operation, (ii) having successfully completed an approved ATPL Theoretical Knowledge Course together with fourteen ATPL theoretical examinations, (iii) having a valid instrument rating and multi-engine class rating.

Applicants for a commercial pilot licence must be at least 18 years old, hold a valid UK Part-FCL Class 1 medical certificate, have met the specified practical and theoretical training requirements laid down in UK Part-FCL: including at least 200 hours' flying time (150 hours for applicants who have completed an approved course of aeroplanes) including 100 hours' flying experience acting as the pilot in command (abbreviated to 70 hours for applicants who have completed an approved course of aeroplanes), 20 hours' 'cross-country' flying experience with at least one solo flight of not fewer than 300 nautical miles with full-stop landings at two or more different aerodromes, 10 hours' instrument instruction of which no more than five may be instrument ground time and five hours of night instruction including five take-offs and landings if the privileges are to be exercised at night.

ATPL
In addition to the privileges of the CPL, the holder of an Airline Transport Pilot Licence may act as the commander of a multi-crew aircraft under IFR. An applicant for an ATPL must be at least 21 years old, hold a valid class 1 medical certificate, a type rating for a multi-crew aircraft and have completed the required theoretical and flight training and have at least 1,500 hours of flight time. Where a simulator is permitted, no more than 100 hours (of which 25 may be in basic instrument training devices) may be credited towards the issue of the licence. Of the 1,500 hours, the applicant is to have completed 250 hours as PIC of which 150 may be PICUS (pilot-in-command under supervision), 200 hours cross country of which 100 must be as PIC or PICUS, 75 hours instrument time of which not more than 30 may be instrument ground time, 100 hours night flight as PIC or co-pilot and 500 hours in multi-pilot operations in aeroplanes with a maximum take-off weight of at least 5700 kg.

The theoretical exams required for the ATPL cover 14 subjects:

 Air law
 Aircraft general knowledge: Airframe/Systems/power plant
 Aircraft general knowledge: Instrumentation
 Mass and balance
 Performance
 Flight planning and monitoring
 Human performance
 Meteorology
 General navigation
 Radio navigation
 Operational procedures
 Principles of flight
 VFR communications
 IFR communications

Ratings

In addition to their licence, a pilot will obtain one or more ratings. These are qualifications which allow a pilot to fly certain aircraft or in certain conditions. UK licences do not expire, however to use the licence a pilot must have an appropriate rating.

Type and Class ratings

A class rating specifies a broad class of aircraft can be flown. A type rating permits flight only on a single type or aircraft or a group of closely related types.

To fly most light aircraft, a pilot must have a valid Single Engine Piston (SEP) or Multi Engine Piston (MEP) rating. These are class ratings. A Single Engine Piston rating lasts 24 months, when the pilot must pass a proficiency check with an examiner, or demonstrate meeting the minimum flight time and training requirements. The SEP (Land) rating generally the first rating obtained by most pilots. This allows flight of single-piston-engined, non-turbocharged, fixed-pitch propeller, fixed tricycle gear, non-pressurised land aeroplanes (with a few exceptions).

SEP rating holders may undertake formal differences training from an instructor. There are five categories of difference: tailwheel aircraft, retractable undercarriage, variable-pitch propeller, turbocharged engine and cabin pressurisation. There is no formal test for any difference training; the training is signed off as satisfactorily completed in the pilot's logbook by the instructor conducting the training.

Other class ratings include Multi Engine Piston (MEP) landplane, Single and Multi engine piston seaplane, Single Engine Turbine (SET) and Touring Motor Gliders.

There is no Multi Engine Turbine (MET) class rating, as multi engine turbine and all jet powered aircraft require a type rating. To add these to their licence a pilot must undergo a course of training and pass an additional skills test. Differences training is also required for certain complex features within these class ratings.

Night rating

The Night Rating allows a pilot to fly at night. It does not expire. It is required for the ATPL.

Instrument ratings
An Instrument Rating allows a pilot to fly in Instrument Meteorological Conditions (IMC), under instrument flight rules (IFR). Otherwise they must remain in Visual Meteorological Conditions (VMC) at all times. Instrument ratings are issued for aeroplanes, helicopters and airships. An IR is required to act as a pilot on a scheduled flight.

A single engine IR(A) course requires at least 50 hours of instrument time with an instructor. A multi-engine IR(A) requires at least 55 hours instrument time with an instructor. Pilots who already hold a CPL are credited with 10 hours, to avoid repetition.

The Competency-Based Instrument Rating course is a reduced course which takes into account previous experience. It results in a full instrument rating.

The Instrument Rating (Restricted) is a simplified version of the IR with fewer privileges. The IR(R) allows flight in IMC but only in certain classes of airspace and with restrictions on conditions for take-off and landing. It is a national rating, meaning it is not ordinarily recognised outside the UK. It had previously been agreed that pilots who already held the rating before April 2014 would be allowed to use it indefinitely within the UK and to transfer it to a new UK PPL as an Instrument Rating (Restricted).

Instructor and Examiner ratings
Flight Instructor and Examiner ratings extend the holder's privileges to act, respectively, as an instructor and to act as an examiner for proficiency checks and skill tests. These ratings both exist in a variety of forms whose domains, or ranges of privileges, are for specified aircraft operations.

Medical certification

To use their licence, a pilot must have a valid medical certificate or make a medical declaration.

For UK Part-FCL licences, a UK Part-Med certificate is required. UK Part-Med was inherited from EASA Part-Med. For the LAPL, an LAPL medical certificate can be issued by some GPs. For the PPL, a Class 2 Medical is required, which can be issued by an AeroMedical Examiner (AME). For the CPL, a Class 1 Medical is required. Initial Class 1 Medical examinations must be carried out by an Aero-Medical Centre (AeMC), but subsequent ones can be issued by an AeroMedical Examiner.

For UK licences other than Part-FCL licences, a pilot may make a Pilot Medical Declaration (PMD) instead of gaining a medical certificate. PMDs are not automatically recognised outside of UK airspace.

Radio licence
To operate an Aircraft Radio Station in a UK registered aircraft, the pilot must hold a Flight Radiotelephony Operator's Licence (FRTOL).

Flight Navigator's Licence

The Flight Navigator's Licence allows the holder to act as flight navigator in any non-EASA aircraft. None have been issued since 2012.

See also 
 Civil Aviation Authority (United Kingdom)
 Pilot licensing and certification

References

External links 
 NPPL Licensing Group
 British Microlight Aircraft Association
 Light Aircraft Association (UK)

Aviation licenses and certifications
Aviation in the United Kingdom
Flight training in the United Kingdom